Ziyou may refer to:

 Ran Qiu, courtesy name Ziyou (子有)
 Yan Yan (disciple of Confucius), courtesy name Ziyou (子游) E

See also
 Ziyu (disambiguation), or Tzu-yü